Chemico-Biological Interactions is a peer-reviewed scientific journal covering toxicological aspects of interactions between chemicals and biological systems.

External links 
 

Publications established in 1969
Elsevier academic journals
Toxicology journals
English-language journals